The Transkei dwarf chameleon or Pondo dwarf chameleon (Bradypodion caffer) is a chameleon endemic to the Eastern Cape Province of South Africa.

Reproduction
Transkei dwarf chameleon are ovoviviparous.

Habitat and conservation
Transkei dwarf chameleon inhabit low coastal forests. This habitat is deteriorating because of overgrazing by domestic livestock, clearing of land for agriculture, fuel-wood collection, invasion by introduced plants, and urbanization. The species occurs in the Silaka Nature Reserve, but is not known from other protected areas.

References

External links
 Search for Distribution of Bradypodion caffrum

Bradypodion
Endemic reptiles of South Africa
Reptiles described in 1889
Taxa named by Oskar Boettger